The 1921–22 season was Chelsea Football Club's thirteenth competitive season.

Table

References

External links
 1921–22 season at stamford-bridge.com

1921–22
English football clubs 1921–22 season